Mary Jorie Millben is an American singer, actress and media personality. Millben has performed for three consecutive U.S. Presidents: George W. Bush, Barack Obama and Donald Trump. In addition, Millben has been a featured soloist for notable international royalty including Queen Noor of Jordan and Princess Basmah bint Saud Al Saud. Millben is the founder and CEO of JMDE Enterprises. She is featured in the online series Impact Now. Millben is a 2010 Helen Hayes Award Nominee.

Early life and education
Millben was born and grew up in Oklahoma City, Oklahoma.  She is the daughter of Michael Millben, a Baptist and Pentecostal minister. Her mother, Althea Millben is a classically-trained soprano and a retired Pentecostal music pastor. Millben started singing at the age of five in the children's choir at Wildewood Christian Church in Oklahoma City.  Her parents divorced in 1987 and Millben was raised by her mother. Millben attended Putnam City High School. Millben studied opera at the University of Oklahoma under tenor Don Bernardini. Millben was elected the second OU African-American female Student Body President in 2004 and the first OU African-American female Vice-President in 2003.

Career

In 2005, Millben worked as a summer White House intern for President George W. Bush and as a White House presidential appointee for President Bush from September 2006 to January 2009. Millben was invited by former First Lady Laura Bush as a guest soloist for the 2008 White House Holiday Season. In 2009, Millben left the government and accepted the role of Wanda in an equity show, Crowns, at Arena Stage. Millben was a guest soloist, with Grammy Award winner Tramaine Hawkins, for the inauguration of The Honorable Barbara Lee (D-California) at the Congressional Black Caucus ceremonial swearing-in at the United States Capitol in Washington D.C., a back-up singer for Bruce Springsteen and Beyonce in the 2009 “We are One” Obama Lincoln Memorial inaugural concert, and backup singer for the Super Bowl XLIII halftime show with Bruce Springsteen. Millben performed alongside Bill Cosby at the 2010 Best of Black Business Awards ceremony. She starred as Sister Pauletta Denise Jones in the Washington D.C. 2010 premiere of a new musical, Sanctified. A review in the Washington Examiner praised her strong soprano voice. In 2013, Millben headlined a solo concert for Europe's celebration of Black History Month in Zagreb, Croatia. Upon invitation from Cui Tiankai, the Chinese Ambassador to the United States, Millben performed The Star-Spangled Banner and the March of the Volunteers for the 40th Anniversary of U.S.-China Student Exchanges at the Embassy of China in Washington, D.C. on 21 November 2019. In August 2020, Millben performed of India’s national anthem Jana Gana Mana for the 74th anniversary of India's Independence.

Personal life
Millben is a devout Christian. Millben has three sisters, Micthea Millben-Ireland, twin sister Michelle Millben, and sister-in-law Melissa Millben along with one brother, Malachi Millben.

References 

1982 births
Living people
Oklahoma Republicans
21st-century African-American women singers